The Stora Hammars image stones are four Viking Age image stones located in Stora Hammars, Lärbro parish, Gotland, Sweden dating from around the 7th century CE.

Description
The four Stora Hammars image stones are phallic shaped. Similar combinations of death with this erotic symbology occur on other Gotland rune and image stones. The images on the Stora Hammars II and IV stones are very worn and not currently decipherable.

Stora Hammars I
Depicted on the Stora Hammars I stone are six panels with mythological, religious and martial background, including panels depicting a woman between two men, a sacrifice scene with a Valknut over an altar, a woman standing between a longship manned with armed warriors and another group of armed men, and a battle scene. It is interpreted as illustrating the legend of Hildr and its never-ending battle. The stone includes an image of a warrior about to be hanged from a tree, possibly as a blood eagle sacrifice, with a nearby Valknut nearby (considered to be Odin's cult symbol) giving validity to reports regarding human sacrifice in Norse paganism. Near the altar is a shaped stone, which one scholar has been suggested may be a cult stone similar to the Elgesem runestone.

Stora Hammars III
The Stora Hammars III image stone has four panels, the lower of which shows a ship with warriors. One of the panels has been interpreted as depicting Odin in the form of an eagle taking the mead of poetry, a legend described in section 6 of the Skáldskaparmál. Gunnlöð and Suttungr are shown to the right of the eagle. Another panel depicts a rider on a horse being greeted by a woman who has been interpreted as being a Valkyrie. The woman appears to be wearing a long serk or underdress, which may be pleated, and a short overdress.

See also
Blood eagle
Death in Norse paganism
Tängelgarda stone

References

External links
Photograph of Stora Hammars I - Swedish National Heritage Board
Photograph of Stora Hammars II - Swedish National Heritage Board
Photograph of Stora Hammars III - Swedish National Heritage Board
Photograph of Stora Hammars IV - Swedish National Heritage Board
Photograph showing 4 stones - Swedish National Heritage Board

Rune- and picture stones on Gotland